Astyanax jordani  is a freshwater fish of the characin family (family Characidae) of
order Characiformes, native to Mexico. It is sometimes called the cave tetra, or by its local Spanish name tetra ciego.

A blind cave fish, A. jordani is very closely related to the Mexican tetra (A. mexicanus) and their taxonomy is disputed. Some treat the two as variants of a single species (in which case A. jordani is a junior synonym of A. mexicanus) and this is supported by phylogenetic evidence, but others continue to recognize the two as separate species.

A. jordani is listed on the IUCN Red List as Vulnerable on the basis of shrinking population and an acutely restricted and diminishing habitat. It is fairly resilient, however, having a population doubling time of 15 months.

The fish was named in honor of C. Basil Jordan of the Texas Aquaria Fish Company (Dallas, Texas, USA), who donated the type specimens and for making his discovery of the first recorded blind characin known to the scientific and aquarium world.

It reportedly has been introduced to the Philippines.

References 

Cave fish
Tetras
Astyanax (fish)
Freshwater fish of Mexico
Endemic fish of Mexico
Taxa named by Carl Leavitt Hubbs
Taxa named by William T. Innes
Fish described in 1936